This is a list of the complete squads for the 2017–18 World Rugby Women's Sevens Series.

Captains for a tournament have their number marked in bold.

Australia
Coach:
 Tim Walsh (to Sydney)
 John Manenti (Kitakyushu onwards)

Canada
Coach:  John Tait

England
Coach:  James Bailey

Fiji
Coach:  Iliesa Tanivula

France
Coach:  David Courteix

Ireland
Coach:  Anthony Eddy

Japan
Coach:  Hitoshi Inada

New Zealand
Coach:  Allan Bunting

Russia
Coach:  Andrey Kuzin

Spain
Coach:  Pedro de Matías

United States
Coach:  Richie Walker

Non-core teams
One place in each tournament of the series is allocated to a national team based on performance in the respective continental tournaments within Africa, Asia, Europe, Oceania, and the Americas.

Brazil
Coach:  Reuben Samuel

China
Coach:  Lu Zhuan

Papua New Guinea
Coach:  Larry John

South Africa
Coach:  Renfred Dazel

Wales
Coach:  Nick Wakley

See also
 2017–18 World Rugby Sevens Series squads (for men)

References

!
World Rugby Women's Sevens Series squads